Mike Schneeberger (born August 5, 1962, in Superior, Wisconsin) is an American curler. He competed in the 2002 Winter Olympics in Salt Lake City where the team finished 7th.

Teams 
2002 Winter Olympics, 1995 World Men's Championship, 1996 World Men's Championship

 Tim Somerville, Skip
Mike Schneeberger, Third
Myles Brundidge, Second
John Gordon, Lead

References

External links 

Living people
1962 births
Sportspeople from Superior, Wisconsin
American male curlers
Olympic curlers of the United States
Curlers at the 2002 Winter Olympics
American curling champions